Ivo is a local government area in Ebonyi State, Nigeria.
Towns include Akaeze and  Ishiagu, home of the Federal College of Agriculture, Ishiagu.

Oil pipelines passing through the area have been attacked by armed vandals who broke the pipes and scooped up the oil.
Environmental damage caused by spillage has also been reported.

Notable people
 Anyim Pius Anyim
 Tekno
 Angela Okorie

References

Local Government Areas in Igboland
Local Government Areas in Ebonyi State
Populated places in Ebonyi State